Neyret is a red Italian wine grape variety. Neyret may also refer to:

 Aurélie Neyret (born 1983), French illustrator and cartoonist of bande dessinée
 Bob Neyret (born 1934), French dental surgeon and semi-professional rally driver
 Michel Neyret (born 1956), former French police chief of staff in Lyon